Fachri Albar (born 15 November 1981) is an Indonesian actor and musician. He is best known for starring in Joko Anwar's Neo-noir thriller Dead Time: Kala in 2007 and psychological thriller The Forbidden Door in 2009.

Career

Acting 
Albar debuted on the small screen in a modern retelling of the folklore Malin Kundang opposite veteran actress Desy Ratnasari. The series premiered in January 2005 on SCTV and ran for two seasons, but Albar only appeared in one season. Albar then had his feature film debut in November 2005 with the release of Alexandria as one of the main characters opposite Marcel Chandrawinata, Julie Estelle, and Kinaryosih.

His next projects came in 2007 in the role of drag performer Amanda in Jakarta Undercover and as Janus in Dead Time: Kala. His performance in the latter earned him his first Citra Award nomination in the Best Actor category, losing to Deddy Mizwar (Nagabonar Jadi 2) as well as an MTV Indonesia Movie Awards in the Most Favorite Actor category, this time losing to Mizwar's co-star in Nagabonar Jadi 2, Tora Sudiro. He then appeared opposite Marsha Timothy in Anwar's follow-up release The Forbidden Door as Gambir, an artist who one day meets a young boy and starts to uncover secrets. The film was critically acclaimed and introduced Albar to the international scene through screenings at international film festivals.

After years of absence from films, Albar appeared in Richard Oh's experimental film Melancholy Is a Movement as himself as well as in a segment co-directed by Timo Tjahjanto and Gareth Evans for the horror anthology film V/H/S/2 in 2015. He then made a brief special appearance in a post-credit scene in Joko Anwar's 2017 international hit Satan's Slaves.

Music 
Fachri is a drummer for the punk rock band Jibriel. His brother Fauzy Albar is also part of the band as lead vocalist. The band released their debut single "Raih" in May 2007 and their debut studio album ...Memecah Kesunyian (lit. Breaking the Silence) in June the following year.

Personal life 
Albar is the son of rock star and vocalist Ahmad Albar of the legendary Indonesian rock band God Bless and actress Rini S. Bono. He is the middle of 3 brothers. His older brother Fauzi Albar is the lead vocal of Jibriel, the punk rock band of which Albar is also a member of as a drummer. In August 2018, Albar lost his other brother Faldi Albar due to liver failure. Albar is also a step brother to racing driver Sean Gelael by his mother's subsequent marriage to business mogul Ricardo Gelael.

On 12 June 2014, Albar married model and actress Renata Kusmanto. They have two children: son River Syech Albar and daughter Clover Satin Albar.

Filmography

Film

Television

Awards and nominations

References

External links

1981 births
Living people
Indonesian film actors
Indonesian people of Yemeni descent
People from Jakarta
Indonesian drummers